Runners or The Runners may refer to:

 Runners (band), an Australian band
 Runners (botany), part of a plant
 Runners (film), a British film starring James Fox 
 The Runners (production duo), an American production duo
 "The Runners" (song), a 2016 song by the Naked and Famous
 The Runners (sculpture), a sculpture in Oklahoma
 The Runners (Urban Wall), a mural in Indiana, United States
 Runners, term for sneakers in Ireland

See also
 Runner (disambiguation)
 The Runner (disambiguation)
 The Runners Four